Classic situation of Malfunction is a 1987 Greek comedy film, released on video only. It was directed and written by Takis Vougiouklakis. It starred Kostas Tsakonas and Tasos Kostis as two very incompetent repairmen of household appliances.

External links

1987 films
1980s Greek-language films
1987 comedy films
Greek comedy films